Y90 may refer to:
 Yttrium-90 (Y-90 or 90Y), an isotope of yttrium
Yankee Terminal Radar Approach Control